The J.M. Abraham Poetry Award, formerly known as the Atlantic Poetry Prize, is a Canadian literary award, presented annually by the Atlantic Book Awards & Festival, to the best work of poetry published by a writer from the Atlantic provinces.

Winners
1998 – Carmelita McGrath, To the New World
1999 – John Steffler, That Night We Were Ravenous
2000 – Ken Babstock, Mean
2001 – Anne Simpson, Light Falls Through You
2002 – M. Travis Lane, Keeping Afloat
2003 – Anne Compton, Opening the Island
2004 – Brian Bartlett, Wanting the Day
2005 – David Helwig, The Year One
2006 – Anne Compton, Processional
2007 – Steve McOrmond, Primer on the hereafter
2008 – Don Domanski, All Our Wonder Unavenged
2009 – Brent MacLaine, Shades of Green
2010 – Tonja Gunvaldsen Klaassen, Lean-To
2011 – John Steffler, Lookout
2012 – Susan Goyette, outskirts
2013 – Lesley Choyce, I'm Alive. I Believe in Everything
2014 – Don Domanski, Bite Down Little Whisper
2015 – Susan Paddon, Two Tragedies in 429 Breaths
2016 – Susan Goyette, The Brief Reinacarnation of a Girl
2017 – Jennifer Houle, The Back Channels
2018 - Julia McCarthy, All the Names Between
2019 - Allison Smith, This Kind of Thinking Does No Good
2020 - Lucas Crawford, Belated Bris of the Brainsick
2021 - Afua Cooper, Black Matters

See also
List of poetry awards

Notes

External links
Writers' Federation of Nova Scotia

Canadian poetry awards
Atlantic Book Awards
Awards established in 1998
1998 establishments in Nova Scotia
English-language literary awards